In mathematics, the Malgrange–Ehrenpreis theorem states that every non-zero linear differential operator with constant coefficients has a Green's function.
.

This means that the differential equation

where P is a polynomial in several variables and δ is the Dirac delta function, has a distributional solution u. It can be used to show that

has a solution for any compactly supported distribution f. The solution is not unique in general.

The analogue for differential operators whose coefficients are polynomials (rather than constants) is false: see Lewy's example.

Proofs
The original proofs of Malgrange and Ehrenpreis were non-constructive as they used the Hahn–Banach theorem. Since then several constructive proofs have been found.

There is a very short proof using the Fourier transform and the Bernstein–Sato polynomial, as follows.  By taking Fourier transforms the Malgrange–Ehrenpreis theorem is equivalent to the fact that every non-zero polynomial P has a distributional inverse. By replacing P by the product with its complex conjugate, one can also assume that P is non-negative. For non-negative polynomials P the existence of a distributional inverse follows from the existence of the Bernstein–Sato polynomial, which implies that Ps can be analytically continued as a meromorphic distribution-valued function of the complex variable s; the constant term of the Laurent expansion of Ps at s = −1 is then a distributional inverse of P.

 gives a detailed discussion of the regularity properties of the fundamental solutions.

A short constructive proof was presented in :

is a fundamental solution of P(∂), i.e., P(∂)E = δ, if Pm is the principal part of P, η ∈ Rn with Pm(η) ≠ 0, the real numbers λ0, ..., λm are pairwise different, and

References

Differential equations
Theorems in analysis
Schwartz distributions